This is a list of the National Register of Historic Places listings in Angelina County, Texas.

This is intended to be a complete list of properties listed on the National Register of Historic Places in Angelina County, Texas. There are 41 properties listed on the National Register in the county. Three properties are also Recorded Texas Historic Landmarks.

Current listings

The locations of National Register properties and may be seen in a mapping service provided.

|}

See also

National Register of Historic Places listings in Texas
Recorded Texas Historic Landmarks in Angelina County

References

External links

Registered Historic Places
Angelina County
Buildings and structures in Angelina County, Texas